Kappe Arabhatta was a Chalukya warrior of the 8th century who is known from a Kannada verse inscription, dated to c. 700 CE, and carved on a cliff overlooking the northeast end of the artificial lake in Badami, Karnataka, India.  The inscription consists of five stanzas written out in ten lines in the Kannada script.  Stanza 2 (Lines 3 and 4) consists of a Sanskrit śloka.  Of the remaining stanzas, all except the first are in the tripadi, a Kannada verse metre.  

Stanza 3 (lines 5 and 6), which consists of twelve words of which nine are Sanskrit loan-words in Kannada, is well known in a condensed version, and is sometimes cited as the earliest example of the tripadi metre in Kannada.  However, neither stanza 3 nor stanza 4 strictly conform to the precise rules of the tripadi metre; they each have more than 18 moras in line two, in excess of the allowed 17.

Location

Kappe Arabhatta inscription text

The following is the text of the five lines written out in ten lines in the inscription. The meanings of the words are provided in the footnotes below the text.  Lines 3 and 4 consist of a Sanskrit sloka, and is not translated.  Here  |  denotes the end of each line of the tripadi metre and  || , the end of the stanza:

Dictionary for Translation of inscription

1a "Kappe," Kannada, "a frog; that which hops" and has cognates in related languages: Telugu "kappa - a frog;" Tulu "kappe - a frog, probably from 'kuppu' - to hop, or 'kappu' - to  cover;"  1b "Ara" and "bhaṭṭa" are both Prakrit words: the former means "virtue," the latter, itself derives from Sanskrit "bhartā." 1c Śiṣṭajana priyan: Beloved of the good people.  Sanskrit. priya,
2a kaṣṭajanavarjitan: avoided by evil people, adj. s. m. sg. nom. qualifying Kappe-Arabhattan.  Sanskrit. kaṣṭa, jana, varjita; 2b kaliyugaviparita: an exceptional man in the kaliyuga. Sanskrit, viparita adj. s. m. sg. nom qualifying Kappe-Arabhattan; 
5a sadhuge: to the good people. Sanskrit sadhu, s. n.; 5b sadhu: Good, kind, person.  Sanskrit.  s. m.; 5c madhuryamge: to the sweet. s. m. sg. dat Sanskrit. madhurya-; 5d madhuryam: sweetness. s. m. sg. nom. Sanskrit;  5e bādhippa: causing distress, fut. p. of badhisu - to cause distress, from Sanskrit bādh - to harass.
6a kalige: to the kali age.  s. m. sg. dat. Sanskrit . kali-; kali - hero.; 6b: Madhavan: Visnu, Sanskrit. Madhava - s. m. sg. nom.; 6c: ītan: this man, dem. pron. m. Telugu: ītadu - probably i + tān - this self (speaker) or ī + tan - this of mine; 6d: peran: another.  From pera - outer place; the outside.  MK hera; NK hora; Tamil: piran - a stranger; Malayalam: piran - another; Telugu: pera - another; 6e alla: is not, neg. pr. of intr. al (to be fit); Tamil al, alla-: no, not; Malayalam alla: no, not.
7a oḷḷitta: what is good (adj. s. n.); 7b keyvōr: those who do; 7c ār: who (inter. pron.); 7d polladum: The evil also.  adj. s. n. sg. nom. + um (NK holladu, hole)—Tamil: pol—to agree with, negative of this is pollā. Tamil: pollā, pollāda: bad, vicious (neg. of pon: to shine), Malayalam: pollā - to be bad, evil; pollu - hollow, vain, useless; Telugu: pollu - useless; Tulu: polle - slander, backbiting. 7e adaramte - like that (adv.) (adara stem. pron.) amte: adv. p. of an: to speak.; 7f ballittu: Strong  adj. s. n.; 
8a: purākṛtam: the ancient karma (Fleet); the deeds done in the past.  Sanskrit ; 8b illi: here. 8c: samdhikkum:  8d adu - it (pron);  8e bamdu - having come (adv. pp. of bar - to come.  Tamil vandu; Malayalam vandu; Telugu vacci;  
9a kaṭṭida - bound  pp. of kattu - to bind; Tamil: kaṭṭu, Malayalam: kaṭṭu; Tulu: kaṭṭu - to bind; 9b simghaman The lion. Sanskrit. simgha-, s. n. sg.; 9c keṭṭodē: harmful thing; 9d en what  (intl pron.) 9e biṭṭavōl: in the same way as releasing. adj.;   
Malayalam:  mēṇ: what is above; superiority; menavan—a superior śudra (modern Malayalam mēnon), replaced by mattu in Modern Kannada. 10d sattar: died; past pl. of sā - to die. Tamil cā - to die, past. Sattān. Malayalam cā - to die; Telugu - caccu - to die; pp. caccina. Tulu sāy, sāi - to die, pp. satta-; 10e avicāram: without foresight. (Fleet translates as "without doubt.") Sanskrit. avicāra.

Literal translation
1 Kappe1a Arabhata,1b beloved of the good people1c
2 avoided by evil people,2a an exceptional man in Kaliyuga2b 
5 To the good people,5a good;5b to the sweet,5c sweetness;5d  |  causing distress5e 
6 to the kali age,6a an exceptional man in Kaliyuga,2b  | Madhava (or Vishnu),6b  this man6c  another6d is not6e || 
7 What is good7a  those who do7b  who7c  the evil7d like that7e  |  strong7f 
8 exception to (or opposite)2b the ancient karma8a  |  here8b  samdhikkum8c it8d  having come8e  || 

Popular version of Stanza 3 in Kannada script
A condensed version of Stanza 3 seems to be well known, both in the Kannada script:

and in the English poetic rendering:

"Kind man to the kind,
Who's sweet to the sweet, 
Very cruel to the cruel
He was nothing but God Vishnu in this regard"

See also
Badami
Chalukya dynasty
Kannada literature

Notes

References

External links

Chalukya dynasty

History of Karnataka
Badami Chalukya inscriptions